Enchirito is the trademarked name of Taco Bell's menu item of the Tex-Mex food similar to an enchilada. It is composed of a flour tortilla filled with seasoned ground beef taco meat (with options to substitute steak or chicken), beans, diced onions, cheddar cheese, and "red sauce".

History
There is an unsubstantiated claim that the Enchirito was invented in 1967 by a high school student in Montebello, California.

However, a 2008 article published in the Long Beach Press-Telegram claimed that a Cerritos, California, franchise owner named Dan Jones had created the Enchirito.

In an article published in a Corsicana Daily Sun in 1971, there is a third claim that a Taco Bell franchise owner in Texas was the actual inventor.

The original Enchirito of the 1970s was advertised as a special tortilla filled with ground beef, pinto beans, and onions; topped with red sauce, cheese and olives. It was served in a reheatable aluminum foil tray. One of the earliest print references to the Enchirito is an August 1967 Taco Bell ad in an Amarillo, Texas, newspaper for a meal consisting of a taco, Enchirito, and soft drink for $0.89.

Taco Bell registered the name with the United States Patent and Trademark Office as a service mark in May 1970.  In its application, Taco Bell described the item as a [ Combination Enchilada And Burrito Prepared As Part Of ] Restaurant Services and that "Enchirito" Is Merely A Fanciful Combination Of "Enchilada" And "Burrito."

Name
The coining of the name Enchirito (a portmanteau of the words enchilada and burrito) for this item was a peculiar action by Taco Bell.  It was the only item on the menu, at the time, to not use the common Mexican food nomenclature for that item.  Whereas a burrito is typically a flour tortilla filled with beans, and an enchilada is typically a corn tortilla filled with meat and smothered in chile sauce, the name Enchirito communicates the combination of these elements.  On the other hand, it appears the unusual name was not to help Americans unfamiliar with the Spanish names of the food items; indeed, for many years Taco Bell menu boards featured a system of phonetic pronunciation guides next to each item.

Reappearance
Even after the Enchirito was officially discontinued in 1993, some customers still ordered them, and word spread through the Internet that many restaurants would still make them with the ingredients they had available. Due to this underground popularity, it was decided to bring it back, and commercials, featuring the Taco Bell chihuahua promoting the Enchirito, began airing on December 26, 1999, with later commercials in mid-2000 featuring the rapping or singing styles of the "five guys with no talent". However, some things about the item had changed. The serving container had become a coated pressed-paper oblong bowl when dining in, or a black plastic bowl with a clear plastic lid if ordering from the drive-thru.  Most significantly, the character of the dish was altered by changing the yellow corn masa tortilla to a white wheat flour tortilla. The sliced olives were omitted. The chicken Enchirito and the steak Enchirito, which respectively substitute chicken or steak for the ground beef, were also introduced as options. The Enchirito is served with a plastic spork.
The Enchirito was once again discontinued when Taco Bell introduced the Smothered Burrito on July 25, 2013.  While it may not be currently seen on the menu, it can be requested when ordering.

A typical ground beef Enchirito contains 209 calories, 17 grams of fat (8 grams saturated), 45 milligrams cholesterol, and 1110 milligrams of sodium.

References

External links
 Picture of a 1973 Taco Bell menu board

Taco Bell
Products introduced in 1968